The Marion Education Channel or MEC is an Independent cable channel operated by the Marion County public school system in Ocala, Florida, United States. It is currently carried on area Cable systems and was formerly transmitted over-the-air on VHF channel 7.

MEC's programming consists of educational television programs and documentaries covering various academic subjects. The channel also airs locally produced content including k12connect, Scholar of the Month, and the Marion Education Channel Game of the Week.

Former translators 
The Marion Education Channel formerly operated a translator station, which rebroadcast its signal to other parts of the broadcast market:

Notes:

 1. Originally known only as W07BP, the station flash-cut to digital television on its existing channel on February 1, 2009. Shortly afterward, the station's callsign was slightly changed to "W07BP-D".

References

Educational and instructional television channels
Television stations in Florida
Cable television in the United States
Television channels and stations established in 1983